One is Ra's debut EP and was released in 2000. The songs "End of Days" and "What I Am" were not included on their debut album From One. However, "What I Am" is included in their album Black Sheep.

One was only sold (for $10) during Ra's concerts, and soon went out of circulation when Ra's debut album From One hit stores. The EP is still available through Ra's online merchandise store, but is otherwise a rare collector's item.

In an interview with SoundCheck Magazine, Sahaj Ticotin (the lead singer) talked about One:

"It just says Ra One since it’s the first CD. The theme is kind of a double meaning. The record is primarily about loneliness…different variations of loneliness. So I named it One also because of that."

Track listing

Personnel
Sahaj – lead vocals, guitar
Ben Carroll – guitar
Sean Corcoran – bass, backing vocals
Skoota Warner – drums

References 
 https://web.archive.org/web/20091126094208/http://www.epinions.com/content_2953683076
 http://www.sabob.com/products/From_One.html

External links 
 Information

Ra (American band) albums
2000 EPs